Christopher Seldon (born 18 July 1953) is a Welsh former rugby union and professional rugby league footballer who played in the 1970s and 1980s.

Background
Chris Seldon was born in Glyncoch, Wales, having originally worked as a machine operator, and served in the Welsh Guards, he later set up his own insurance company in Pontypridd.

Playing career
Chris Seldon came up through the ranks of Pontypridd Youth before progressing to the club's senior team in 1973.

Time spent in service with the Welsh Guards, alongside his Ponty back row partner, Michael "Mike" Shellard, helped mould Chris into a hard as nails back row forward who gave nor asked any quarter on the field of play.

Gaining honours with Wales 'B' against the touring Pumas of Argentina in 1975, Chris was a member of the senior national squad, but unlucky not to win a full Welsh cap.

International honours
Chris Seldon represented Wales 'B' (RU) in 1975 while at Pontypridd against Argentina (Los Pumas), and was a member of the senior squad, and won caps for Wales (RL) while at St. Helens in 1980 1-cap + 1-cap (interchange/substitute).

References

External links
Profile at saints.org.uk
(archived by web.archive.org) 'Hall of Fame' profile at Ponty.net

1953 births
Living people
Cardiff City Blue Dragons players
Footballers who switched code
Pontypridd RFC players
Rugby league players from Rhondda Cynon Taf
Rugby league props
Rugby league second-rows
Rugby union flankers
Rugby union number eights
Rugby union players from Rhondda Cynon Taf
St Helens R.F.C. players
Wales national rugby league team players
Welsh Guards soldiers
Welsh rugby league players
Welsh rugby union players